John Mordaunt may refer to:
John Mordaunt (speaker) (d. 1504), Tudor politician and Speaker of the House of Commons
John Mordaunt, 1st Baron Mordaunt (d. 1562)
John Mordaunt, 2nd Baron Mordaunt (1508–1571)
John Mordaunt, 1st Earl of Peterborough (1600–1643)
John Mordaunt, 1st Viscount Mordaunt (1626–1675), Royalist conspirator
Sir John Mordaunt, 5th Baronet (bef. 1649–1721)
John Mordaunt, Viscount Mordaunt (c. 1681–1710)
John Mordaunt (British Army officer) (1697–1780), English general and Member of Parliament
John Mordaunt (MP) (c. 1709–1767), British soldier and Member of Parliament
Sir John Mordaunt, 7th Baronet (1734–1806)
Sir John Mordaunt, 9th Baronet (1808–1845)
Colonel John Mordaunt, in Lucknow and the subject of Colonel Mordaunt's Cock Match